Joseph Skelton may refer to:
 Joseph John Skelton, English engraver
 Joseph Ratcliffe Skelton, English illustrator